Marc Ford and the Neptune Blues Club is the third album (and the first one with his new band The Neptune Blues Club) by guitarist/singer-songwriter Marc Ford. The album was released on September 15, 2008 (UK) and September 23, 2008 (US) on the Blues Bureau International label.

Marc Ford has gathered into The Neptune Blues Club experienced blues musicians of Southern California, who's played earlier in The Blasters, Hazmat Modine, Tom Waits' band, with Big Joe Turner, Mick Taylor, Joe Houston, Hubert Sumlin, The Fabulous Thunderbirds, Gatemouth Brown, David Lynch, Bruce Willis, Top Jimmy, Lester Butler, Lee Allen, Nels Cline, Greg Ginn among others.

Track listing 
 Main Drain
 Locked Down Tight
 Freedom Fighter
 Go Too Soon
 Don't Get Me Killed (M.Malone, M.Ford)
 Last Time Around
 Spaceman
 Pay for My Mistakes (M.Malone)
 Shame On Me
 Mother's Day (M.Malone)
 Smilin' (M.Ford, A.Arvizu, J.Bazz, M.Malone)
 Keep Holdin' On
All songs written by Marc Ford, except as indicated.

The Neptune Blues Club 
Marc Ford – Vocals, Electric guitar, record producer
Mike Malone – Vocals (5,8,10), Keys, Backing vocals, Harmonica (5,8)
Anthony Arvizu – Drums, Sound engineer
John Bazz – Upright bass
Stephen Hodges – Junkyard percussion
Bill Barrett – Harmonica (except 5,8)

External links 
Marc Ford official website
Marc Ford & The Neptune Blues Club MySpace
Marc Ford MySpace
Shrapnel Records Purchase Info

2008 albums
Marc Ford albums